Pamela Valdivieso is a beauty pageant winner who was crowned Miss Earth El Salvador 2015.

Pageantry

Miss Earth El Salvador 2016
Valdivieso was crowned Miss Earth El Salvador on August 22 at the Auditorio Fepade, and was scheduled to represent the El Salvador at Miss Earth 2016.

Miss Earth 2016
Having won the Miss Earth El Salvador 2015 title, Valdivieso was El Salvador's representative to be Miss Earth 2015, attempting to succeed Jamie Herrell as the next Miss Earth.

Originally, Valdivieso was supposed to compete at Miss Earth 2016, but replaced her successor, Claudia Martínez, to compete for the 2015 edition instead. The reason for this move was not disclosed to the public.

References

Salvadoran beauty pageant winners
Miss Earth 2015 contestants
Year of birth missing (living people)
Living people